João Pedro Costa Contreiras Martins (born 20 April 2000), commonly known as João Pedro, is a Brazilian footballer who plays as a winger.

Career statistics

Club

References

2000 births
Living people
Brazilian footballers
Association football forwards
CR Vasco da Gama players
Footballers from Rio de Janeiro (city)